Jihe is a village in Satara district, Maharashtra, India. It is situated on the banks of Krishna River, approximately 15 km away from Satara, a city in Satara district. Jihe is approached using the Rahimatpur Road.

References 

Villages in Satara district